The 2004 Wake Forest Demon Deacons football team was an American football team that represented Wake Forest University during the 2004 NCAA Division I-A football season. In their fourth season under head coach Jim Grobe, the Demon Deacons compiled a 4–7 record and finished in a tie for last place in the Atlantic Coast Conference.

Schedule

Team leaders

References

Wake Forest
Wake Forest Demon Deacons football seasons
Wake Forest Demon Deacons football